North Carolina Agricultural and Technical State University (also known as North Carolina A&T State University, North Carolina A&T, N.C. A&T, or simply A&T) is a public, historically black land-grant research university in Greensboro, North Carolina. It is a constituent institution of the University of North Carolina System. Founded by the North Carolina General Assembly on March 9, 1891, as the Agricultural and Mechanical College for the Colored Race, it is the second college established under the provisions of the Morrill Act of 1890, as well as the first for people of color in the State of North Carolina. Initially, the college offered instruction in agriculture, English, horticulture and mathematics. In 1967, the college was designated a Regional University by the North Carolina General Assembly and renamed North Carolina Agricultural and Technical State University.

With an enrollment of over 13,000 students, North Carolina A&T is the largest historically black college or university (HBCU) in the United States, a position it has held since 2014. The university's College of Engineering graduates more black engineers than any other campus in the United States; its College of Agricultural and Environmental Sciences produces more African American agriculture graduates than any campus in the country. The university is also a leading producer of African-American kinesiology undergraduates, landscape architects, nurses, teachers and journalism/mass communication grads.

The university offers 54 undergraduate, 29 master's and nine doctoral degrees through its eight colleges, one school and one joint school; the university awards more than 2,600 degrees annually, and has an alumni base of around 65,000. The university is classified as a high activity research university by the Carnegie Classification of Institutions of Higher Education. The university ranks third in sponsored funding among University of North Carolina system institutions. As of 2021, the university conducts over $78 million in academic and scientific research annually, and operates 20 research centers and institutes on campus. The university's designation as a land grant institution reflects its broad range of research with ongoing projects funded by agencies such as the National Aeronautics and Space Administration (NASA), U.S. Department of Agriculture, U.S. Department of Defense, National Institutes of Health and the National Science Foundation.

The school's students, alumni, and sports teams are known as "Aggies". The university's varsity athletic teams, are members of the Colonial Athletic Association (CAA) in all sports with the exception of Women's bowling and Football. As members of the Mid-Eastern Athletic Conference (MEAC), from 1970 to 2021, the football program earned 11 conference championships, made 5 NCAA FCS playoff appearances, and won the Celebration Bowl 4 times from 2015 to 2019. The men's basketball program has reached the NCAA Tournament 10 times, while the women's basketball team has made the tournament 5 times, with their most recent appearance being in 2021. The Aggies' men's and women's track and field teams, placed third and fourth respectively, at the 2021 NCAA Division I Outdoor Track and Field Championships. Members of the team went on to represent the United States at the 2020 Olympics, where they captured 3 medals, 2 of them being gold.

History

Founding and early years

North Carolina A&T's history can be traced back to 1890 when the United States Congress passed the Second Morrill Act. Aimed mainly at the Confederate states, the second Morrill Act of 1890 required that each state show that race was not an admissions criterion, or else to designate a separate land-grant institution for persons of color. In order to comply with the Second Morrill Act and yet prevent the admission of African Americans to the North Carolina College of Agriculture and Mechanic Arts, now known as North Carolina State University, the college's Board of Trustees were empowered to make temporary arrangements for students of color.

On March 9, 1891, the Agricultural and Mechanical College for the Colored Race was established by an act of the North Carolina General Assembly as an annex of the private Shaw University in Raleigh. The act read in part: "That the leading objective of the college shall be to teach practical agriculture and the mechanic arts and such learning as related thereto, not excluding academic and classical instruction." The college, which started with four teachers and 37 students, initially offered instruction in agriculture, English, horticulture, and mathematics. The college continued to operate in Raleigh until the Board of Trustees voted, in 1892, to relocate the college to Greensboro.

The college granted admission to both men and women of color from 1893, until the Board of Trustees voted to restrict admission to males only in 1901. This policy would remain until 1928, when female students were once again allowed to be admitted. In 1899, The college conferred its first degrees to seven graduates.

In 1904, the college developed a  farm equipped with the latest in farm machinery and labor-saving devices. The university farm provided much of the food for the campus cafeteria. In 1915, the North Carolina General Assembly changed the name of the college to Negro Agricultural and Technical College of North Carolina.

Expansion and growth

In 1925, Dr. Ferdinand D. Bluford was selected as the third president of the college, and A&T became a member of the Colored Intercollegiate Athletic Association (now known as the Central Intercollegiate Athletic Association). The next year, the college's National Alumni Association was established. In 1928, the 27-year ban on female students was lifted as the college once again was granted co-educational status. By December 1931, female students were allowed, for the first time, to participate in the student government as members of the student council. In 1939, the college was authorized to grant the Master of Science degree in education and certain other fields. Two years later, the first Master of Science degree was awarded.

The 1940s and 1950s saw the college expand its land holdings. In 1946, the college acquired  of land adjacent to the original  campus. In 1953, the School of Nursing was established, with the first class graduating four years later. 1955 saw more changes, as Dr. Warmoth T. Gibbs was selected as the fourth president of the college. Two years later, the college experienced another name change to the "Agricultural and Technical College of North Carolina". In that same year, the college's first white student, Rodney Jaye Miller of Greensboro, was admitted.  In 1959, the college was fully accredited by the Southern Association of Colleges and Schools (SACS).

Civil Rights Movement
On February 1, 1960, four male freshmen helped spark the civil rights movement in the South. Ezell Blair (Jibreel Khazan), Joseph McNeil, Franklin McCain, and David Richmond "sat in" at an all white eating establishment (Woolworth's) and demanded equal service at the lunch counter. The actions of the four freshmen gained momentum as other students of the university joined them in their non-violent protest to desegregate Woolworth's lunch counter, which became known as the Greensboro sit-ins. By the end of July 1960, Blair, McNeil, McCain and Richmond were dubbed the A&T Four.

In 1964, John A. Steinhauer, a science teacher, was the first white student to earn a degree from A&T, earning the Master of Science in Education with a concentration in Chemistry. The following year, the college acquired the land of the former Immanuel Lutheran College, a coeducational junior college located adjacent to the college campus. In 1967, The college was designated a Regional University by the NC General Assembly. The college was renamed "North Carolina Agricultural and Technical State University,"

In 1969, student protesters from the college, in addition to students of nearby James B. Dudley High School, were involved in a four-day conflict with the Greensboro Police and the National Guard in which there was one casualty. The conflict, referred to as the 1969 Greensboro uprising lasted May 21 through May 25, was sparked by perceived civil rights issues at the segregated high school, when a popular student council write-in presidential candidate was denied his landslide victory allegedly because school officials feared his activism in the Black Power Movement. Starting on the campus of Dudley High School, the uprising spread to A&T's campus, where students had stood up in support of the Dudley protest. Escalating violence eventually led to an armed confrontation and the subsequent invasion of the campus. Described at the time as "the most massive armed assault ever made against an American university," The uprising ended soon after the National Guard raided the 505-room male dormitory, W. Kerr Scott Hall, taking hundreds of students into protective custody.

1970s to present
In 1971, the North Carolina General Assembly passed legislation bringing all 16 public institutions that confer bachelor's degrees into The University of North Carolina System. As a result of the consolidation, N.C. A&T became a constituent institution and Lewis Carnegie Dowdy, the college's sixth president, was reappointed as the college's first chancellor in July of the following year. The 1988 school year saw N.C. A&T set an enrollment record with 6,200 students. The following year, the college bested its record with a total of 6,500 students.

In 2003, N.C. A&T announced the creation of a Joint Millennial Campus, with neighboring UNC Greensboro, with the intent to focus on regional economic development. The following year, the university was classified as a doctoral/research intensive university by the Carnegie Foundation, in addition to forming a partnership with the U.S. Department of Agriculture's Natural Resources Conservation Service. On May 1, 2006, Lloyd V. Hackley was named interim chancellor of the university. Hackley served in the position until his successor, Stanley F. Battle, was installed as the 11th chancellor on April 25, 2008. Under the Battle administration, the university was awarded an $18 million grant from the National Science Foundation for an Engineering Research Center, the first time an HBCU has been a lead institution for such a center.

On May 22, 2009, Dr. Harold L. Martin, Sr. was elected as the twelfth chancellor of the university. The following year, N.C. A&T received approval to establish a Ph.D. program in Computational Science and Engineering beginning in the fall of 2010. That same year, the Joint School of Nanoscience and Nanoengineering (JSNN) opened with 17 students in the doctoral program in nanoscience and one student in the professional master's program in nanoscience. According to the National Nanotechnology Initiative, The JSNN became one of fewer than 10 schools nationally to offer degree programs in nanotechnology, and is the only program created and operated collaboratively by two universities. In 2011, North Carolina A&T received approval from the University of North Carolina Board of Governors for its Master of Science in Nanoengineering program, Offered through the Joint School of Nanoscience and Nanoengineering (JSNN). In addition to the M.S. degree the university was approved to offer a doctoral program in Nanoengineering.

In 2011, Martin began implementation of "A&T Preeminence 2020," a groundbreaking strategic plan that set ambitious goals for the university in enrollment, research funding, diversity, academic quality and more. As the plan took root, N.C. A&T began a remarkable evolution that saw it become the nation's largest HBCU in 2014, a position it has held ever since. In 2018, it became America's top-ranked public HBCU by U.S. News & World Report magazine, and in 2019, it moved into the numerical rankings of national research universities for the first time in A&T's history. Martin oversaw creation of a new strategic plan in 2018, "A&T Preeminence: Taking the Momentum to 2023." It established a new set of growth goals relative to A&T's mission as a doctoral research university, including expansion of A&T's research programs and increasing the size of the student body to 14,000.

In 2020, MacKenzie Scott donated $45 million to North Carolina A&T.  Her donation is the largest single gift in the university's history and the second largest ever to an HBCU.

Campus

North Carolina A&T's main campus, often referred to as "Aggieland," is located approximately nine blocks east of downtown Greensboro, North Carolina, a city that supports a population of approximately 284,816  and is one of three principal cities that forms the Greensboro-Winston-Salem-High Point CSA also referred to as the Piedmont Triad region.

In addition, the physical plant also includes the  working farm, and Two Research Parks totaling a combined . The main roads that create the campus boundaries are East Bessemer street, to the north; East Market street, to the south; North O'Henry Boulevard (U.S. Route 220/U.S. 29/U.S. 70), to the east; North Dudley street, to the west; and East Lindsay street to the northeast. The main entry point of the campus is located at the intersection of East Market street and North Benbow road.

A portion of today's main campus comprises the Agricultural and Technical College of North Carolina Historic District, which was named to the National Register of Historic Places in 1988. This  area along the university's western boundary, consists of five Colonial Revival and Classical Revival style buildings that are the universities oldest standing structures.

With the growth of the university's student body, N.C. A&T has significantly expanded its facilities, most notably through the construction of the Student Center, a 150,000-square-foot complex that houses student organizations, dining facilities, gaming areas, a ballroom and more. Construction began in 2018 on the $90-million Harold L. Martin Sr. Engineering Research and Innovation Complex, which will expand the teaching and research capacity of the university's nationally prominent College of Engineering.

University galleries

Located inside the James B. Dudley Memorial Building, the university galleries are home to the Mattye Reed African Heritage and the H. Clinton Taylor Collections. Founded in the late 1960s, the Reed African Heritage Collection is dedicated to the ancestral and contemporary arts of Africa and the Caribbean. The Reed Collection houses around 3,500 artifacts, art, and craft items from more than 35 African and Caribbean nations. The collection is named for Mattye Reed, the site's first curator and director. Reed helped collect a great number of the pieces through soliciting donations from friends and former colleagues on behalf of the university. The Taylor Collection, named for the founder of the university's art department, presents rotating exhibits by both established and upstart African-American Artists, in addition to work created by the university students and faculty.

Sustainability
The University of North Carolina spends roughly $227 million a year on energy. In 2009, the UNC Board of Governors adopted environmental policies reflective of the UNC System's commitment to lead the State of North Carolina to a more sustainable future. The goal of the initiative is to reduce energy consumption by 30 percent at all UNC institutions and affiliates by 2015.

Since 2003, North Carolina A&T has reduced energy use by 21 percent. According to research conducted by the university, the energy efficiency measures in place inside the 123 buildings on the campus have saved enough energy to meet the power needs of 760 households for a year. In the 2011–12 fiscal year alone, a 32.5 billion BTU reduction in energy helped the university avoid $386,274 in costs. Under the university's Strategic Energy Plan, N.C. A&T has implemented energy efficiency measures such as: comprehensive energy audits to identify improvement needs; development of a retro-commissioning process for existing buildings; energy-efficient lighting retrofits throughout the campus; and the development of green network strategies.

In the area of green building, the university is in the process of developing a green building policy that will require the use of sustainable and green building practices wherever feasible and practical on future construction. , there are four green building initiatives being conducted by the university. The Proctor School of Education Building utilizes green roof technology in addition to other sustainable components aimed at reducing storm water runoff and energy demands for air conditioning in the summer months. Joint School of Nanoscience and Nanoengineering (JSNN) Building located at the off-campus Joint Millennial Campus site, was certified as a LEED Gold level building in 2013.
In addition to the school of education and Nanotechnology buildings, the university is planning an environmentally-friendly student center and opened its new student health center in 2015. The two-story, 27,548-square-foot building is LEED silver level certified, and the university's first completely green facility.

Through these efforts towards sustainability and environment friendly university management, N.C. A&T was ranked 10th, out of 301 institutions from 61 countries, in the 2013 The Universitas Indonesia (UI) GreenMetric World University Sustainability Ranking. Additionally, the university ranked 5th among 164 institutions in the category of Campus Setting (Urban) and 9th among 224 institutions in the Comprehensive Higher Education category.

Organization and administration

North Carolina A&T is one of 16 public universities that constitute the University of North Carolina System. As a constituent institution of the UNC System, N.C. A&T is governed by a Board of Governors and administered by a president. The 24 voting members of the Board of Governors are elected by the State General Assembly for four-year terms. The current president of the UNC System is Peter Hans.

Chancellor

Each of the UNC campuses is headed by a chancellor who is chosen by the Board of Governors on the president's nomination and is responsible to the president. The current chancellor of N.C. A&T is Dr. Harold L. Martin Sr. In 2009, Martin became the 12th chancellor of the university, and the first alumnus to serve in the position, following the resignation of his predecessor, Stanley F. Battle. Martin marked his 10th year as chancellor in 2019, a decade marked by strong enrollment growth, increased national recognition of the university's academic quality and contributions in STEM disciplines and its evolution as a land grant, doctoral research university.

Prior to his appointment as chancellor, Martin was the senior vice president for academic affairs at The University of North Carolina, General Administration where he led the development and implementation of the university's academic mission, including teaching, research, international programs, and student affairs. Martin currently serves on the Southern Association of Colleges and Schools (SACS) Commission on Colleges and Schools and on the boards of technology nonprofit MCNC and Blue Cross and Blue Shield Foundation. Previously, he served on advisory committees of the National Aeronautics and Space Administration, chaired the board of directors of the Southern Consortium for Minorities in Engineering, and served on the boards of trustees of the NC School of Science and Mathematics, the NC Board of Science and Technology, and the NC Biotechnology Center Advisory Board.

Board of Trustees
In the UNC System, each university has its own board of trustees. N.C. A&T's Board of Trustees consists of eight members elected by the Board of Governors, four appointed by the governor, and the president of the student body, who serves as an ex officio member. Current Trustees include Lynn Wooten, president of Simmons University; Timothy King, a retired Dow Chemical executive; Venessa Harrison, president of AT&T Georgia;  Hilda Pinnix-Ragland, retired Duke Energy corporate affairs and business executive; Bhaskar Venepalli, President and CEO of CiVentiChem; and John W. Bluford, President and founder of Bluford Healthcare leadership Institute, who serves as vice-chair of the board.

Budget and endowments

The 2017-2018 expenditures totaled $288 million.  The state of North Carolina provided $99 million of support in appropriations and other aid.  Tuition and fees and sales and services provided an additional $100 million.  N.C. A&T received $95 million from contracts and grants, with $57 million of that earmarked for student financial aid.  Other sources of income for the university include gifts, income from investments. As of 2018, the university endowment was valued at just over $57 million.

Academics
North Carolina A&T is accredited by the Commission on Colleges of The Southern Association of Colleges and Schools (SACS), which is one of the six regional accreditation organizations recognized by the United States Department of Education and the Council for Higher Education Accreditation. N.C. A&T holds the distinction as being the nation's leading producer of African American engineers, in addition to being the leading producer of African-American women engineers at the bachelor's level. The university is second largest producer of African-American engineers at the master's level behind Georgia Institute of Technology and Johns Hopkins University; and the leading producer of African-American doctorates in engineering. The university is also noted for its degrees in agriculture. The School of Agriculture and Environmental Sciences is the largest agricultural school among historically black universities, and the nation's second largest producer of minority agricultural graduates. Additionally, the university is a leading producer of minority certified public accountants, veterinarians, and psychology undergraduates.

N.C. A&T offers a selective Honors College for high-achieving undergraduate students of all majors.  The Honors College provides special opportunities and privileges to admitted students.  There are about 1,000 students enrolled in the Honors College.

, N.C. A&T has an enrollment of 10,629 undergraduate and 1,513 graduate students; and according to data released by the University of North Carolina System, the university awarded 1,669 bachelor's degrees, 423 master's degrees and 57 doctoral degrees in the 2017–2018 academic year.

Colleges and schools

The university offers 54 Undergraduate, 29 master, and nine doctoral degrees through its nine professional colleges. The colleges and schools function as autonomous units within the university, and adheres to the university's mission and philosophy. Bachelor and Master degree programs are offered through the College of Agriculture and Environmental Sciences (CAES); College of Arts, Humanities and Social Sciences (CAHSS); Willie A. Deese College of Business and Economics (CoBE); College of Education (CEd); College of Engineering (CoE); College of Health and Human Sciences (CHHS) and the College of Science and Technology (CoST). Doctoral programs are offered through the CAES, CoE, CoST, The Joint School of Nanoscience and Nanoengineering and The Graduate College.

In 2020, N.C. A&T dedicated its first named college, Willie A. Deese College of Business and Economics. The college is named for the 1977 alumnus, retired pharmaceutical executive and renowned philanthropist.

Since 1968, A&T's academic programs were divided among nine different academic divisions. During this time, the university added a number of schools including of the School of Business and Economics in 1970; School of Technology in 1987; and the Joint School of Nanoscience and Nanoengineering in 2010. This realignment would remain until 2016, when the university again realigned its academic programs in an effort to meet the objectives of their Preeminence 2020 strategic plan. All courses at the university are on a credit hour system.

Rankings

Institutional rankings of North Carolina A&T vary, depending on the criteria of the publication. According to the 2020 issue of U.S. News & World Reports Best Colleges, N.C. A&T was ranked No. 1 as the best public historically black university (HBCU) in the nation and the 6th best HBCU overall; criteria include tuition and fees, total enrollment, fall acceptance rate, retention, and graduation rates. Among national universities, it is tied for 281 and one of only a few HBCU represented in the National University rankings.

N.C. A&T was ranked No. 3 by Money Magazine for highest early career earnings among campuses in the UNC System in the Best Colleges for Your Money 2019 rankings. The Wall Street Journal also named N.C. A&T a No. 2 public U.S. university in combining research and teaching in 2016.

Admissions

Admission to North Carolina A&T is rated as "more selective" by U.S. News & World Report. The university received over 30,000 applications for the Fall 2022 semester. The university maintains a Rolling Admissions program. Of those students admitted, their average GPA was 3.77, SAT scores averaged 1058 while ACT scores averaged 19.99.

Incoming freshmen are eligible to receive the Lewis and Elizabeth Dowdy, Cheatham-White or the National Alumni Association scholarships. The Lewis and Elizabeth Dowdy Scholarship, named after the university's sixth chancellor and his wife, covers the full cost of tuition and is available to students with a 3.75 high school GPA and a minimum 1200 SAT or 26 ACT score. The National Alumni Association Scholarship, provided by the N.C. A&T National Alumni Association, also covers the full cost of tuition and is available to students with a minimum 3.0 cumulative GPA and a 1000 or 22 ACT score. The Cheatham-White Scholarship is named for Henry P. Cheatham and George H. White, two African Americans who represented North Carolina in the United States Congress around the turn of the 20th century. From difficult beginnings – Cheatham was born enslaved, and White, the son of a mother whom historians say was also likely enslaved – each worked hard to earn a university education before launching careers in teaching, law and ultimately public service. The scholarship is a fully funded four-year award that covers the costs of tuition, student fees, housing, meals, textbooks, a laptop computer, supplies, travel and personal expenses. Scholarships also provides four summers of fully funded enrichment and networking opportunities that may include international travel and study. It is truly a complete award, meant to recognize academic achievement and potential at the highest levels.

Research
North Carolina A&T is a member of the Southeastern Universities Research Association and classified by the Carnegie Foundation as a doctoral-granting high research activity university. In the 2018 fiscal year, the university conducted over $64 Million  in academic and scientific research. , the university ranks third in sponsored funding among University of North Carolina institutions, with a total of $64 million of awarded funds. Of that total, over 90 percent were funds awarded from federal agencies.

As a Land-grant university, N.C. A&T's research focus include the areas of: Aerospace and transportation systems; Biomedical research; Biotechnology and Bioscience; Computer and computational science; Defense and National security; Energy and the environment; Food science; Human health, Nutrition, and Wellness; Nanotechnology and Multi-scale materials; Social and Behavioral sciences; and Transportation and Logistics.

The university operates 20 research centers and institutes and maintains partnerships with government agencies such as the U.S. Department of Agriculture, U.S. Department of Defense, National Institutes of Health, and the National Science Foundation, which in 2008 awarded $18 million in grants for an Engineering Research Center. Nine interdisciplinary research clusters enable scholars to exchange ideas and explore research areas and to work with industry, other research organizations, and the community. NC A&T research clusters include Advanced Materials and Nanotechnology, Biotechnology and Biosciences, Computational Science and Engineering, Energy and Environment, Information Systems and Technology, Leadership and Community Development, Logistics and Transportation Systems, Public Health, and Social and Behavioral Sciences.

Student life

North Carolina A&T has a total undergraduate enrollment of 10,298, with a gender distribution of 43 percent male students and 57 percent female students, with 75 percent of students being North Carolina residents, 4 percent being international students and the remainder coming from other areas of the US. As a historically black university, the racial make up of the student body is 77.91 percent African American and 23 percent non-African-American. Under the university's strategic plan dubbed "A&T Preeminence: Taking the Momentum to 2023," the university increased the non-African-American student population and plans to continue its growth through 2023.

Residence life
Roughly 40% of students live in university owned, operated, or affiliated residence halls, apartments and residential communities.

The majority of residence halls on campus are coeducational. Of the remaining residence halls, 18 percent are female only and 9 percent are single sex male residence halls. Students can also apply to live in living-learning communities, which consists of specially-themed residential areas with specially designed academic and social activities for its residents such as The Honors and International Programs Community; Teaching Fellows Program; and communities which focus on creating unique living experiences. Each residence hall has its own hall government, with representatives in the Residence Hall Association. Despite the availability on-campus housing, the residence halls are complemented by a variety of housing options. 65 percent of students live off-campus, mostly in the areas closest to campus, in either apartment communities or former single-family homes.
The university residence halls offer a variety of living options, from double occupancy traditional to single occupancy suite and apartment living. The area known as North Campus provides Traditional, Suite, and Apartment style living options for students residing on campus. North campus residence halls include: Cooper Hall, Alex Haley Hall, and The Aggie Village. The Aggie Village, commonly referred to as simply "The Village," are the newest residence halls built on campus. Completed in 2005, the centrally located six building complex contains four three-story residential buildings, two administrative buildings with offices and classroom space. The four residential units within the complex are named for Ezell Blair, Franklin McCain, Joseph McNeil, and David Richmond; collectively known as the A&T Four and replaced the former W. Kerr Scott Hall which was ceremoniously demolished on July 11, 2004. South campus provides all Traditional style residence halls. South campus residence halls include: Barbee, Curtis, Holland, Speight (formerly Morrison), Morrow, and Vanstory Halls. Barbee Hall, built in 1980, is the tallest building on campus, besides BB&T Stadium. The six story residence hall is named for Zoe Parks Barbee, one of the first African American commissioners of Guilford County, houses 388 students. East campus provides suite and apartment-style living to students. The residence halls on East Campus are: Pride Hall, The Aggie Suites, and Aggie Terrace. Both the Aggie Suites and Pride hall were financed through the North Carolina A&T University Foundation and were completed in 2001 and 2005, respectively.

Student Government Association
The North Carolina A&T State University Student Government Association, commonly referred to as simply the SGA, is the undergraduate student government of N.C. A&T. The present SGA is an outgrowth of the Student Council of N.C. A&T, which was restructured in 1935 from an earlier organization by the same name. The mission of the SGA is to Create an atmosphere of freedom that allows students to move beyond the limits of traditional interests by being a creative and contributing individual; Aid in a meaningful interpretation of the concept of the university community; Provide opportunities for each student to participate in activities that develop and realize potentialities; and create awareness of national and international affairs and of their significance for the individual.

Student organizations and activities

Student organizations are registered through the Office of Student Activities, which currently has a registry of over 120 student organizations that covers a variety of organizations including national honor and drama societies; departmental, social and hometown clubs; performance groups; student military; fraternities and sororities; residence councils; the Student Union Advisory Board; and classes.

The Council of Presidents serves as the governing body of registered and recognized student-run organizations at North Carolina A&T. The council is a participatory body composed of the student organization presidents designed to serve as a liaison which assists, governs, and advocates for the registered and recognized student organizations on the campus of N.C.A&T and their respective memberships.

The Blue and Gold Marching Machine, the university's marching band program provides music for campus events. Established in 1918, the 200 plus member marching band, has performed on national stages such as the Macy's Thanksgiving Day Parade, Honda Battle of the Bands, and the Bank of America 500.

Media
The A&T Register and "The Voice" WNAA 90.1 FM are the official media outlets of the university. Students of the university contribute to both "The Register" and the campus radio station. The Register was first published in 1894. Currently, the student newspaper is published digitally with two print editions during each fall and spring semesters. The A&T Register has won numerous awards over its history, and is recognized locally, statewide, and nationally as one of the premier HBCU publications. In 2013, The Register was awarded first place in newswriting and second place in Opinion writing by the North Carolina College Media Association. The Register also earned awards from the 2014 National HBCU Student News Media Conference. The paper was awarded second in the "Best News Coverage" and "Best Student, Non-regular production, Newspaper" categories; and third in the "best design tabloid or broadsheet" category.

Started in 1966 as WANT 620 AM, The campus radio station started with the donation of a refurbished radio console from local radio station WEAL. Because The FCC mandated that college radio stations could not compete with commercial radio, WANT was transmitted out of Price Hall on closed circuit A.M. radio transmitted to strategic buildings on campus via cable. The first day's broadcast carried, in part, remarks from the campus Board of Trustees and then president Lewis C. Dowdy. WANT continued operation until 1979, when the campus station switched to an F.M. format, and became WNAA 90.1 FM. Today, WNAA is broadcast both over the air and on-line, serving the Greensboro, High Point Winston-Salem metropolitan radio market.

Through the Journalism and Mass Communication department, students manage "The JOMC Journal," a student generated multimedia news platform, a state-of-the-art high definition television studio, and The Aggie Media Group, a public relations agency that provides services including: Media Relations, Quantitative and Qualitative research; social media, community, publicity campaigns and event planning.

Greek life

The Greek System at North Carolina A&T dates back to the 1910s, and is home to 18 recognized organizations including eight of the nine of the historically African-American National Pan-Hellenic Council (NPHC) fraternities and sororities, national service, honorary, and professional organizations. Currently, roughly 1.4 percent of undergraduate male students are members of a fraternity, while roughly 1.2 percent of undergraduate female students are members of a sorority.

Active fraternities at N.C. A&T include Alpha Phi Omega, a national co-ed community service fraternity; Kappa Kappa Psi, a national honorary Band fraternity; and Pershing Rifles, is a military fraternal organization for college-level students: and social fraternities Alpha Phi Alpha, the oldest Greek lettered organization on the campus, chartered in 1929; Kappa Alpha Psi, Omega Psi Phi, Phi Beta Sigma, Iota Phi Theta, Lambda Chi Alpha, Phi Mu Alpha Sinfonia, a collegiate social fraternity for men with a special interest in music; and social fellowship Groove Phi Groove.

Active sororities at the university include Chi Eta Phi, a professional association for registered professional and student nurses; Tau Beta Sigma, a national honorary band sorority; and social sororities Alpha Kappa Alpha; Delta Sigma Theta; Zeta Phi Beta; Sigma Gamma Rho; and social fellowship Swing Phi Swing.

Events

Annual events on the campus celebrate North Carolina A&T traditions, alumni, sports, and culture. In early March, the university celebrates Founders' Day, which observes the anniversary of the founding of the university.

Homecoming, which usually occurs in the month of October, coincides with a home football game, and festivities such as tailgating, class and departmental events, nightlife and social functions, musical and comedy concerts, pep rallies, student showcases, fraternity and sorority step shows, a parade, and the coronation of Mister and Miss North Carolina A&T, the university's Homecoming King and Queen. Dubbed the "Greatest Homecoming on Earth" (GHOE) by students and alumni, the week-long celebration brings in an influx of over 40,000 alumni and visitors to the city. In a 2011 study conducted by the Greensboro Convention and Visitors Bureau, the economic impact from homecoming was measured at $11.3 million.

Commencement exercises date back to the university's first graduating class in 1899. In 2018, the university awarded 2,149 total bachelor's, master's and doctorate degrees. Two commencement programs are scheduled each year for the university. Students who complete degree requirements during the summer sessions and the fall semester are invited to participate in the December commencement exercise, while students who complete degree requirements in the spring are invited to participate in the May commencement services. Notable speakers include Dr. Mary Elizabeth Carnegie, distinguished educator and champion for the preservation of the history of African-American nurses; Frank Porter Graham, Former president of the University of North Carolina at Chapel Hill and senator; Donna Brazile, political analyst and Vice Chairwoman of the Democratic National Committee; and First Lady of the United States, Michelle Obama.

Athletics

North Carolina A&T fields a total of 17 varsity sports; eight for men and nine for women. The varsity teams participate in the NCAA Division I and are members of the Colonial Athletic Association (CAA) in all sports with the exception of women's bowling and Football. The school's athletic teams are known as the Aggies, and represented by a bulldog mascot. The term "Aggie" has long been used to refer to students who attend agricultural schools. Hence the reason the university adopted the nickname at the time of the school's founding.

, the Aggies have earned more than 60 MEAC and CIAA regular-season and tournament titles. The men's basketball team has earned 16 total conference regular-season and tournament championships, including an eight consecutive titles in the 1980s. In 2013, the Aggies made history when the team won their first Division I post-season game defeating the Liberty Flames in the first round of the 2013 NCAA Division I men's basketball tournament. The women's basketball program has had success in their own right. The Lady Aggies have claimed six MEAC regular season and two MEAC tournament championships. Their most notable accomplishments include advancing to the regional semifinals in the 2010 Women's National Invitation Tournament, making them the first Division I HBCU program to win two games in a Division I post-season tournament.

Besides basketball, N.C. A&T has been nationally successful in both football and track and field. The Aggie football team has claimed eight MEAC and five CIAA conference championships. The Aggies have also won four Black college football national championships. The Aggie men's and women's track and field program has produced 65 individual MEAC champions, and five All-Americans; four MEAC Outdoor championships, One MEAC Indoor championship, and in 2005, placed fifth in the 4 × 100 meters relay in the NCAA Division I national championship.

A&T enjoys a number of rivalries with a number of schools, however, the Aggies' principal rival is North Carolina Central University. The two schools share this rivalry across all sports and date back to 1924 when the two schools met in football.

Notable alumni

North Carolina A&T's alumni base is over 55,000 strong. These alumni have excelled in fields ranging from education, civic leadership, activism, to athletic; and spread the Aggie tradition throughout the nation such as Ronald McNair, former NASA Astronaut who perished on the ill-fated Space Shuttle Challenger explosion, graduated magna cum laude from the university with a degree in engineering physics in 1971. Some alumni are notable for being pioneers in their fields, such as Former Chief of the United States Army Nurse Corps Clara Leach Adams-Ender, who was the first woman to receive her master's degree in military arts and sciences from the U.S. Army Command and General Staff College and also the first African-American nurse corps officer to graduate from the United States Army War College.

N.C. A&T alumni are well represented throughout higher education, from Simmons University President Lynn Perry Wooten to Prairie View A&M University President Tomika P. LeGrande. A&T itself is led by its first alumnus to serve in that role, Chancellor Harold L. Martin, Sr., who is the longest currently serving chancellor in the UNC System and the longest currently serving HBCU leader in America.

N.C. A&T graduates have served in government on many levels including local, state, the United States Senate and United States House of Representatives, such as North Carolina House of Representatives member Alma Adams; retired politician Edolphus Towns, who represented the state of New York in the United States House of Representatives; Pennsylvania House of Representatives member Jake Wheatley; and former politician Jesse Jackson Jr., who represented the state of Illinois in the U.S. House of Representatives. Michael S. Regan is the first administrator of the Environmental Protection Agency to graduate from a HBCU and first African-American man to hold this role.

N.C. A&T alumni have long been associated with political activism and civil rights, including Ezell Blair Jr., Franklin McCain, Joseph McNeil, and David Richmond. Known collectively as the Greensboro Four, they staged sit-in demonstrations at the Greensboro Woolworth's lunch counter, which refused to serve customers of color. Another alum noted for his civil rights work is Jesse Jackson, founder of the Rainbow and PUSH Coalition.

Leaders in business have also passed through the university's halls, such as Janice Bryant Howroyd, founder and CEO of the ACT-1 Group, the nation's largest minority woman-owned employment agency, Hilda Pinnix-Ragland, the first African-American woman vice president at Progress Energy Inc and Duke Energy, and Joe Dudley founder, president and CEO of Dudley Products Inc., a manufacturer and distributor of hair and skin care products for the African American community.

Several N.C. A&T graduates are involved in media as well.  Terrence J, the well-known BET and E! News host and actor in multiple TV shows and movies, is the National Ambassador for the Thurgood Marshall College Fund, a role that, in part, gives him a platform to tout his experience at N.C. A&T.  Kevin Wilson Jr. is an Oscar-nominated filmmaker known for the film, "My Nephew Emmett." Other media alumni include Jessica De Vault Hale, an editor of Hype Hair magazine and Sandra Hughes, who was a news anchor at Greensboro's CBS affiliate WFMY for 40 years.

N.C. A&T alumni have also excelled in athletics such as Al Attles, one of the first African-American professional basketball coaches in the NBA; Pro Football Hall of Fame inductee Elvin Bethea; four-time Super Bowl champion, Dwaine Board; Brad Holmes, formerly a star quarterback for the Aggies, is now college recruiting coordinator for the L.A. Rams and played a significant role in assembling the team that made it to the Super Bowl LIII; and, Tarik Cohen, running back for the Chicago Bears.

References

Further reading

External links
 
 NCAT athletics website

Historically black universities and colleges in the United States
Land-grant universities and colleges
 
Educational institutions established in 1891
University of North Carolina
Public universities and colleges in North Carolina
Universities and colleges in Greensboro, North Carolina
Universities and colleges accredited by the Southern Association of Colleges and Schools
1891 establishments in North Carolina
African-American history of North Carolina
Historically segregated African-American schools in North Carolina